Georgios Makropoulos (born 23 September 1953) is a Greek chess International Master (IM) (1979), seven-times Greek Chess Championship winner (1971, 1973, 1975, 1977, 1978, 1980, 1985). His wife is chess player Marina Makropoulou.

Chess player career 
As a player Georgios Makropoulos belonged to the Greek chess elite in the 70s and 80s. He twice participated in World Junior Chess Championship (1969, 1971). Between 1971 and 1985 Georgios Makropoulos won the Greek Chess Championship seven times. He has been International Master since 1979 and achieved a Grandmaster norm in the 1980 Banco di Roma tournament.

Georgios Makropoulos played for Greece in the Chess Olympiad:
 In 1972, at first reserve board in the 20th Chess Olympiad in Skopje (+4, =8, -2).
 In 1974, at first board in the 21st Chess Olympiad in Nice (+3, =1, -3),
 In 1980, at first board in the 24th Chess Olympiad in La Valletta (+5, =3, -3).

Georgios Makropoulos played for Greece in the European Team Chess Championships:
 In 1989, at sixth board in the 9th European Team Chess Championship in Haifa (+3, =2, -2).

Georgios Makropoulos played for Greece in the Men's Chess Balkaniads:
 In 1971, at third board in the 3rd Men's Chess Balkaniad in Athens (+0, =1, -0) and won individual bronze medal,
 In 1973, at fourth board in the 5th Men's Chess Balkaniad in Poiana Brașov (+2, =0, -2),
 In 1978, at first board in the 10th Men's Chess Balkaniad in Băile Herculane (+1, =0, -3),
 In 1979, at first board in the 11th Chess Balkaniad in Bihać (+1, =2, -2),
 In 1981, at first board in the 13th Chess Balkaniad in Athens (+0, =0, -4),
 In 1983, at fourth board in the 15th Chess Balkaniad in Băile Herculane (+1, =3, -0) and won individual silver medal,
 In 1985, at sixth board in the 17th Chess Balkaniad in Irakleio (+2, =2, -0) and won individual silver medal.

Chess official career 
Georgios Makropoulos worked from 1977 as a journalist for the Athens daily newspaper Eleftherotypia. He has been President of the Greek Chess Federation since 1982. Numerous international chess events took place in Greece under his aegis, including the two Chess Olympiads in Thessaloniki: 1984 and 1988.

After the President of FIDE Florencio Campomanes awarded the Chess Olympiad 1986 to Dubai in 1984 and the organizing Chess Federation of the United Arab Emirates then announced that it would not invite the Israeli team, Makropoulos together with Raymond Keene and Don Schultz was member of a negotiation commission, which from the end of 1984 was supposed to find solutions to the crisis that had arisen on behalf of FIDE. Despite international protests and despite the commission's efforts, the Israeli team did not take part in the Dubai Olympics. At the FIDE Congress in Dubai, the statutes were changed in such a way that future refusal by the hosts of individual associations to FIDE events should only be possible with the consent of a three-quarters majority of the FIDE General Assembly.

In 1986 Georgios Makropoulos became Vice President of FIDE. In 1990 he moved to the position of Secretary General of the organization, a position he held until 1996. After that Georgios Makropoulos was Deputy President of FIDE until 2018. In 2006 Makropoulos supported the renewed candidacy of the FIDE President Kirsan Ilyumzhinov, who prevailed at the congress in Turin against Bessel Kok with 96:54 votes. In 2018 Makropoulos himself ran unsuccessfully against Arkady Dvorkovich.

References

External links

1953 births
Sportspeople from Thessaloniki
Living people
Greek chess players
Chess officials
Chess International Masters
Chess Olympiad competitors
20th-century Greek people